Philip Heintz (born 21 February 1991) is a German swimmer. He competed in the 200 m individual medley event at the 2012 Summer Olympics and was eliminated after the qualifying heats. At the 2016 Summer Olympics in Rio de Janeiro, he competed in the 200 m individual medley. He finished in 6th place with a time of 1:57.48.

References

External links

Philip Heintz. schwimmen.dsv.de

Living people
1991 births
Sportspeople from Mannheim
German male swimmers
Olympic swimmers of Germany
Swimmers at the 2012 Summer Olympics
Swimmers at the 2016 Summer Olympics
Swimmers at the 2020 Summer Olympics
Medalists at the FINA World Swimming Championships (25 m)
European Aquatics Championships medalists in swimming
Male medley swimmers